Jemadia menechmus, or Mabille's sabre-wing, is a species of skipper butterflies in the family Hesperiidae.

Description
These butterflies have a broad thorax and a conical abdomen. The uppersides of the wings are black with several longitudinal metallic blue streaks and bands and a few hyaline (glass-like) windows on the forewings.

Distribution
This species occurs in the Amazonian areas of Brazil and Peru.

References
 Funet

External links
Learn about butterflies

Hesperiidae